Mark Alan Eriksson is an American experimental physicist, focusing on experimental studies of nanostructures, especially nanoscale electronic systems, quantum computing; semiconductor membranes, many-body physics and interacting electrons in low-dimensional systems; application of nanoelectronics to biology, currently the John Bardeen Professor of Physics at University of Wisconsin and was elected a fellow of the American Association for the Advancement of Science in 2015. He was also elected a fellow of the American Physical Society.

Education
Eriksson received a masters and doctorate in physics at Harvard University in 1994 and 1997, respectively. He completed a bachelor's degree in mathematics and physics at the University of Wisconsin at Madison in 1992.

References

External links
 

Fellows of the American Association for the Advancement of Science
Fellows of the American Physical Society
21st-century American physicists
University of Wisconsin–Madison faculty
Harvard Graduate School of Arts and Sciences alumni
University of Wisconsin–Madison College of Letters and Science alumni
Living people
Year of birth missing (living people)